The Director of the United States Defense Intelligence Agency is a military officer who, upon nomination by the President of the United States and confirmation by the Senate, serves as the United States' highest-ranking military intelligence officer. As the head of the Defense Intelligence Agency, the Director is the principal intelligence adviser to the Secretary of Defense and the Chairman of the Joint Chiefs of Staff. The Director also reports to the Director of National Intelligence, via the civilian Under Secretary of Defense for Intelligence. 

The Director is also the Commander of the Joint Functional Component Command for Intelligence, Surveillance and Reconnaissance, a subordinate command of United States Strategic Command. Additionally, the Director chairs the Military Intelligence Board, which coordinates activities of the entire defense intelligence community.

The office of DIA Director is rotated between three-star Army, Navy, Air Force, and Marine Corps officers generally every three years.

Line of succession 
In a June 2017 Action Memo, a line of succession was established for the position of Director should the sitting Director become incapacitated by death, resignation, or inability to perform the functions and duties of the office. In descending order the following DIA officials serve in the line of succession:

 Deputy Director
 Chief of Staff
 Director for Mission Services
 Director for Operations
 Director for Analysis
 Director for Science and Technology

List of DIA Directors

References

External links
DIA Web Site

People of the Defense Intelligence Agency
 
Defense Intelligence Agency